Small Town Story or Story of a Small Town may refer to:

 Small Town Story (film), 1953
 Small Town Stories, a 1995 jazz album by Unified Jazz Ensemble, led by Jeff Antoniuk
 Small Town Stories, a 2009 album by A Death in the Family, released by Resist Records
 The Story of a Small Town, a 1978 Taiwanese film
 Small Town Story (album), a 1979 album (partial soundtrack) by Teresa Teng
 "Small Town Story" (song), a song first sung by Teresa Teng in 1978, also called "Story of a Small Town"